SS Shughart (T-AKR-295) is the lead ship of her class of cargo ships operated by the United States Navy. She is a 'roll-on roll-off' non-combat vessel designated as a "Large, Medium-Speed Roll-on/Roll-off" (LMSR) ship.

History
She was originally the Laura Maersk, constructed in 1980 in Denmark by Lindøværftet for A. P. Moller-Maersk Group (Maersk). She was lengthened in 1987 and again in the early 1990s by Hyundai.

On May 7, 1996 Laura Maersk was delivered to Military Sealift Command and was outfitted at the National Steel and Shipbuilding Company's docks in San Diego, California. Operated by Bay Ship Management, the newly renovated ship was renamed USNS Shughart, in honor of Medal of Honor recipient US Army Sergeant First Class Randall D. Shughart. Senator Bob Kerrey of Nebraska was the ceremony's principal speaker and serving as the ship's sponsor was Mrs. Stephanie Shughart, Sergeant Shughart's widow. The Shughart remains under the charter of the US Navy Military Sealift Command and is operated by US Merchant Mariners.

Shughart, along with others in her class, is capable of carrying 58 tanks, 48 other track vehicles, plus more than 900 trucks and other wheeled vehicles. To manipulate the cargo capacity, Shughart utilizes two 110-ton cranes, port and starboard ramps, and a stern ramp.

The ship was transferred to the United States Maritime Administration in March 2022 and became part of the Beaumont Reserve Fleet in Ready Reserve Force as SS Shughart (T-AKR-295), losing her USNS designation.

References

External links

 

1980 ships
Ships built in Odense
Shughart-class cargo ships